The National Hamster Council (NHC) is an organization of hamster pet owners in the United Kingdom.

History
The council was established in 1949.

Clubs
There are three regional clubs under the council, which are:
 Northern Hamster Club
 Midland Hamster Club
 Southern Hamster Club

References

External links
 

1949 establishments in the United Kingdom
Animal welfare organisations based in the United Kingdom
Breeder organizations
Hamsters
Organizations established in 1949